Camp Blizzard is the headquarters of the Antigua and Barbuda Defence Force. 

Camp Blizzard has an Immigration Detention Centre, and a reverse osmosis plant. Camp Blizzard was formerly a U.S. military base.

The facility also has a dock, and some abandoned boats. 

Camp Blizzard is located near Shoal Point, the American University of Antigua, and the V. C. Bird International Airport. It is located in the village of Osbourn, Saint George Parish.

References 

Military of Antigua and Barbuda
Saint George Parish, Antigua and Barbuda